TEAM Linhas Aéreas Flight 6865 (TIM6865) was a short-haul domestic passenger service between Macaé and Rio de Janeiro that flew into a mountain on 31 March 2006. The aircraft, a Let L-410 Turbolet, was conducting a VFR approach to Macaé Airport with 17 passengers and 2 crew on board when it hit the top of Pico da Pedra Bonita in Brazil. Everyone on board was killed in the crash. Brazilian investigative team CENIPA concluded that the VFR approach was inadequate, stating that the visibility at the time was not good enough for a VFR approach.

Flight
TEAM Linhas Aéreas Flight 6865 was operated by TEAM Linhas Aéreas, a domestic airline based in Rio de Janeiro. It was a daily scheduled domestic flight from Macaé in the Brazilian state of Rio de Janeiro to the city of the same name. The Let L-410 bore the Brazilian registration of PT-FSE and was carrying 19 people, consisting of 2 crew and 17 passengers.

The flight took off from Macaé at 17:19 local time. At the time, it was operating under instrument flight rules (IFR) with an estimated time of arrival at 18:02. After taking off from Macaé, the crew stated their intention to cancel their IFR flight plan and added that they wanted to continue the flight under visual flight rules (VFR). This cancellation was approved by an air traffic controller.

As bad weather approached, the crew descended to 2,000 ft. The crew had banked the aircraft to the left when it struck tree tops and slammed into the top of Pico da Pedra Bonita, near the municipality of Rio Bonito. The impact killed everyone on board.

Investigation
Brazilian investigation team CENIPA was involved in the investigation and conducted a 12-month-long investigation into the crash. The final report was released on 19 March 2007, concluding that the crash was categorized as Controlled Flight Into Terrain and was caused by pilot error. The condition of the weather in the area at the time was bad, and it was impossible to make a VFR flight, according to CENIPA. However, the crew of Flight 6865 intentionally changed from IFR to VFR while the visibility was limited. Before the flight, the crew didn't know the weather ahead of them. CENIPA also blamed the crew's poor decision-making, stating that there was inadequate assessment which caused them to fly at a lower altitude than a safe limit.

References

Aviation accidents and incidents in Brazil
Aviation accidents and incidents in 2006
2006 disasters in Brazil
March 2006 events in South America
Rio de Janeiro (state)
Accidents and incidents involving the Let L-410 Turbolet